Berniece Inez Gladys Miracle (née Baker; July 30, 1919 – May 25, 2014) was an American writer, known for her memoir My Sister Marilyn (1994) about her half-sister, actress Marilyn Monroe.

Biography
Berniece Baker was born in Venice, California on July 30, 1919. Her parents, Gladys Pearl Monroe and Jasper Newton "Jap" Baker (1886–1951), were married in 1917. Following their divorce in 1921, Jasper kidnapped Berniece and her brother, Robert Kermit, and raised them in his native Kentucky. Gladys soon remarried and gave birth to a third child, Norma Jean Baker. 

In 1933, Robert Baker died from kidney failure. Two years later, Berniece Baker began attending Pineville High School. She married Paris Miracle (1918–1990) in 1938. Their only child, Mona Rae Miracle, was born on July 18, 1939, twelve days before Miracle's 20th birthday.

During the pregnancy, Miracle received a letter from her mother, informing her that she had a sister, Norma Jean. The half-sisters met in 1944 after exchanging letters and pictures. At the same time, Norma Jean began a modeling career and became an actress under the stage name Marilyn Monroe. She remained in contact with her sister, who visited her in 1961 in her New York home after Monroe had divorced her third husband, Arthur Miller, and had undergone surgery for her cholecystectomy. 

Monroe died a year later and left Miracle $10,000 in her final will. Along with Monroe's second husband, Joe DiMaggio, and her business manager, Inez Melson, Miracle arranged the funeral, choosing the casket and dress. In an interview with ina.fr, she stated:

Throughout her life, Miracle avoided the media and worked as a manufacturing inspector, bookkeeper and costume designer. Miracle died in Asheville, North Carolina, on 25 May 2014, at the age of 94.

My Sister Marilyn 
My Sister Marilyn: A Memoir of Marilyn Monroe was published on June 1, 1994 (on Monroe's birthday and 50 years after the half-sisters first met). Miracle co-authored the book with her daughter Mona; it tells the story of her rare meet-ups with Monroe, up until the latter's death.

It also addresses the mental issues of their mother, Gladys, and the sisters' consequently troubling childhoods, both lacking a mother figure:

The memoir features exclusive photographs and received positive reviews by outlets such as Entertainment Weekly, which wrote that "this portrait of Marilyn is irreplaceable." It remains the only authorized biography of Monroe's family.

References 

1919 births
2014 deaths
20th-century American memoirists
20th-century American women writers
American women memoirists
Marilyn Monroe
People from Gainesville, Florida
People from Venice, Los Angeles
Writers from Los Angeles